Viliame Waqaseduadua (born 23 April 1983 in Suva, Fiji) is a New Zealand rugby union player, usually as a wing. He plays for the Grenoble. He is simply known as Vili or Waga.
Started playing his schoolboy rugby for Ratu Sukuna Memorial School in the annual Deans Trophy competition, the holy grail for secondary schools rugby in Fiji. He helped his team reach the semi-finals in 2001 where they lost to eventual winners Suva Grammar School. It was here that he was scouted by rugby scouts and offered a scholarship to attend Rotorua Boys' High School in New Zealand. He also found success here as their 1st XV also reached final of the National First XV Championship (New Zealand) in 2002 and shared a draw with Gisborne Boys' High School for the title and the coveted Moascar Cup

He starred for the North Harbour team in the Air New Zealand Cup competition. He first played rugby for the Poverty Bay team in the third division, where he single-handedly took the team to win the third division title. He made his provincial debut for Poverty Bay in 2004 against Auckland, where, despite his team going down, his skills were already evident. He has played 28 provincial matches to date, 7 of which for Poverty Bay and the rest for North Harbour. He has scored 20 tries for both teams. He made his Super 14 debut for the Blues against the Highlanders in 2006 and throughout the 2006 Super 14, he played 8 times for the Blues, scoring 1 try. He has also played in the Pacific Nations Cup for the Junior All Blacks team. In 2007, he was recruited by the franchise he made his debut against, the Highlanders. In 2008, he was overlooked by his home province and picked up by the Waikato Chiefs, out of the draft.

The highlight of his career to date was in 2006, when single-handedly won the Ranfurly Shield from Canterbury in 2006, scoring 2 tries.

The All Black coaches did not appreciate his skills and he signed a contract with French Top 14 side Brive in 2009.

In 2009, he represented New Zealand at the 2009 Wellington Sevens, coming back o the team as a senior player, hoping to pass on some of his knowledge of the game to the younger players, four years after last playing in the Sevens tournament.

In 2011, he returned to New Zealand, hoping to remind the national selectors of what they had been missing in the last couple of years while he was away dazzling French crowds with his array of sublime attacking skills. He played for Auckland against Otago in the Air New Zealand Cup.

References

External links
Chiefs profile
Highlanders Profile

1983 births
Living people
New Zealand rugby union players
North Harbour rugby union players
Auckland rugby union players
Blues (Super Rugby) players
Chiefs (rugby union) players
Highlanders (rugby union) players
CA Brive players
FC Grenoble players
SU Agen Lot-et-Garonne players
Expatriate rugby union players in France
New Zealand people of I-Taukei Fijian descent
New Zealand expatriate rugby union players
New Zealand expatriate sportspeople in France
Sportspeople from Suva
New Zealand international rugby sevens players
Male rugby sevens players